Blackhall Gaels is a Gaelic Athletic Association club based in the Parish of Kilcloon. The parish consists of the main townlands of Batterstown, Mulhussey and Kilcloon near the town of Dunboyne, in County Meath. The club plays hurling and football in Meath GAA competitions. The club grounds are located in Batterstown and Kilcloon, and training and matches take place in both these locations on a daily basis. Blackhall Gaels are a young team and currently compete at senior level. Players are usually graduates of the local primary schools: Scoil Naisiúnta Naomh Iosaif, Mulhussey; Scoil Oilibhéar Naofa, Kilcloon, and Rathregan NS in Batterstown. The club won the Meath Senior Football Championship in 2003 after beating Simonstown Gaels in the final.

Honours

Meath Senior Football Championship: 1
2003
Meath Intermediate Football Championship: 2
 1998, 2001
Meath Intermediate Hurling Championship: 2
 2005, 2013
Meath Junior Hurling Championship: 1
 2002

External links
Blackhallgaels.com

Gaelic games clubs in County Meath
Hurling clubs in County Meath
Gaelic football clubs in County Meath